Serbia competed at the 2014 European Athletics Championships in Zürich, Switzerland, from 12–17 August 2014.
The following athletes has been selected to compete by the Serbian Athletics Federation.[1]

Medals

Men's events

Track

Field

Women's events

Track

Field

References

 Official site
 Wiki page
 European athletics

Nations at the 2014 European Athletics Championships
Serbia at the European Athletics Championships